Plopeni is a town in Prahova County, Muntenia, Romania, with a population of 9,611.

Climate
Plopeni has a humid continental climate (Cfb in the Köppen climate classification).

References

Towns in Romania
Populated places in Prahova County
Localities in Muntenia
Monotowns in Romania